A Case of You may refer to:

 "A Case of You" (song), a song by Joni Mitchell
 A Case of You (film), 2013 American film
 A Case of You (horse) (foaled 2018)